Loyola High School, K.D. Peta, is an English medium, Catholic secondary school in Peta, Andhra Pradesh, run by the Society of Jesus (Jesuits).

See also

 List of Jesuit schools

References  

High schools and secondary schools in Andhra Pradesh
Private schools in Andhra Pradesh
Jesuit secondary schools in India
Boys' schools in India
Schools in Visakhapatnam district
Christian schools in Andhra Pradesh
2008 establishments in Andhra Pradesh
Educational institutions established in 2008